Love's River is a 2013 studio album by Laura Sullivan. It received the 2014 Grammy Award for Best New Age Album. Love's River climbed to number 3 on the Top 100 Airplay Chart of Zone Music Reporter in January 2013 and to number 2 in February 2013.

Track listing

Personnel
 William Ackerman – guitar, record producer
 Rob Beaton – mastering
 Tom Eaton – engineer
 Eugene Friesen – cello
 Kerry Gogan – creative producer
 Jill Haley – English horn
 Jeff Oster – flugelhorn, trumpet
 Nancy Rumbel – English horn, oboe
 Michael Starita – engineer
 Eric Sullivan – photography, producer
 Laura Sullivan – composer, engineer, orchestration, piano
 Tania Vercher – creation

References

External links

2013 albums
Laura Sullivan albums
Grammy Award for Best New Age Album